Iron Savior is a German power metal band that was formed in Hamburg in 1996. Following a period of several years working behind the scenes in music production, multi-instrumentalist and producer/engineer Piet Sielck joined with former Helloween bandmate Kai Hansen and then-drummer for Blind Guardian, Thomen Stauch in a new project that would blend power metal with a high-concept science fiction story. The band's debut album Iron Savior introduced the story that would be told over the course of multiple albums, featuring a self-aware space vessel called the Iron Savior and its relationship to the mythical lost civilization of Atlantis.

Critics have compared Iron Savior's sound and musical approach to classic heavy metal bands like Judas Priest, Iron Maiden, and Queensrÿche. Kai Hansen's presence in the band brought to the Iron Savior albums on which he appeared a style heavily influenced by Gamma Ray and Helloween.

Since its inception, Iron Savior has released twelve studio albums, two EPs, three singles and one live album.

Despite numerous lineup changes, Piet has continued to direct the band and is currently the only remaining founding member.

Members

Current band members
 Piet Sielck – lead vocals, guitar (1996–present)
 Joachim "Piesel" Küstner – guitar, backing vocals (2000–present)
 Jan-Sören Eckert – bass, vocals (1997–2003, 2011–present)
 Patrick Klose – drums (2017–present)

Former band members
 Kai Hansen – vocals, guitar (1996–2001)
 Yenz Leonhardt – bass, backing vocals (2003–2011)
 Andreas Kück – keyboards, backing vocals (1998–2003)
 Thomen Stauch – drums (1996–1998)
 Dan Zimmermann – drums (1998–1999)
 Thomas Nack – drums (1999–2017; touring member: 1997–1998)

Timeline

Discography

Albums
Iron Savior (1997)
Unification (1999)
Dark Assault (2001)
Condition Red (2002)
Battering Ram (2004)
Megatropolis (2007) (re-recorded in 2015 as Megatropolis 2.0)
The Landing (2011)
Rise of the Hero (2014)
Titancraft (2016)
Reforged – Riding on Fire (2017)
Kill or Get Killed (2019)
Skycrest (2020)
Reforged - Ironbound (2022)

Extended plays
Coming Home (1998)
Interlude (1999)
I've Been to Hell (2000)

Singles
 Titans of Our Time (2002)
 Time Will Tell (2004)

Live albums
 Live at the Final Frontier (2015)

References

External links 
 Official website
 Official Myspace page
 Text of the Iron Savior story as told through liner notes

Musical groups established in 1996
German power metal musical groups
German heavy metal musical groups
Musical quartets
Noise Records artists
AFM Records artists